A construction set is a set of standardized pieces that allow for the construction of a variety of different models. The pieces avoid the lead-time of manufacturing custom pieces, and of requiring special training or design time to construct complex systems. This makes them suitable for temporary structures, or for use as children's toys. One very popular brand is Lego.

Categories
Construction sets can be categorized according to their connection method and geometry:

 Struts of variable length that are connected to any point along another strut, and at nodes.
 Tesseract connection points are initially flexible but can be made rigid with the addition of clips.
 Struts of fixed but multiple lengths that are connected by nodes are good for building space frames, and often have components that allow full rotational freedom.
D8h (*228) nodes are used for K'Nex, Tinkertoys, Playskool Pipeworks, Cleversticks and interlocking disks in general.
D6h nodes are used for interlocking disks.
Ih (*532) nodes are used for Zometool
 Panels of varying sizes and shapes
 Panels of varying sizes and shapes are connected by pins or screws perpendicular to the panels, which are good for building linkages such as an Erector Set, Mini Unit Beams, Meccano, Merkur, Steel Tec, Lego Technic, Trix, FAC-System, and Überstix
 Panels of varying sizes and shapes with flexible panels or hinges between panels such as Tog'l, Jovo Click 'N Construct, Zaks, and Polydron.
 Struts and panels
Girder and Panel building sets
Synestructics (does not make pentagonal structures)
Ramagon (some panels include studs for connecting with Lego clones)
Geomag (components are magnetic)
Bayko
 Building components with various methods of connection include:
 No connection: toy blocks, Anchor Stone Blocks, KEVA planks, Kapla, and Unit Bricks
 Studs: Engino, Rokenbok, Lego, Lego clones, Coco, Rasti, Tente, Mega Bloks, Fischertechnik, Playmobil, Loc Blocs, Cobi blocks, Betta Builda, Guangdong Loongon (and its subbrands: Cogo, Lepin, Xingboa) and Oxford, Kre-O.
 Notches: Lincoln Logs, GIK, and Stickle bricks
 Sleeves: Capsela
Spherical magnets

Psychological benefits
Construction toy play is beneficial for building social skills and building trust in others because it acts as a collaborative task where individuals have to cooperate to finish the taskbuilding an object out of Lego, for example. The effect was found in high school students.

For children specifically, children who complete models using toy building blocks have much better spatial ability than children who do not complete such models. Spatial ability also predicts completion of models.

Construction toy play is also beneficial for autistic children when both individual and group play with building blocks is incorporated. Autistic children who played with building blocks were motivated to initiate social contact with children their age, able to maintain and endure contact with those children, and were also able to surpass the barriers of being withdrawn and highly-structured.

Influence on architecture 
Renowned architect Frank Lloyd Wright credited his childhood building blocks designed by Friedrich Fröbel as a major influence, and his son John Lloyd Wright invented the widely-known Lincoln Logs building set. In addition to teaching architectural concepts such as modularity and load-bearing construction, many architects credit construction set play as influencing their later design.

See also
Pontiki, construction toy for building models of unusual creatures
Unit block

References

Further reading
Interlocking Puzzle Pieces and other Geometric Toys